Dang Tong District is a district located in Kampot Province, in southern Cambodia.

Dang Tung District, Kampot Province is a relatively new district that was created with pieces of Kampong Trach District and Chouk District in 1986. The district center is in Toom T'mai Village, where a local famous temple and a large market can also be found. It is a beautiful area of the country, filled with green rice fields in the summer and smiling, friendly farmers. Because the road to it was until recently quite bad, there has been minimal development work and limited presence of NGOs in the district. There is no running water, and most residents obtain their water supply from wells and ponds filled during the rainy season. Electricity came to Dang Tung in 2009, but many residents of the district continue to use car batteries as their main source of power, hooking them up to electric light bulbs and phone chargers at home and recharging the batteries at a local generator when needed.

There are over 55,000 people in the district.  These are mostly rice farmers, and the district is the poorest of the eight in the province, with 3,700 people living at the lowest level of poverty.

References 

Districts of Kampot province